Takanori Chiaki (千明 聖典, born July 19, 1987) is a Japanese football player for SC Sagamihara.

Club statistics
Updated to 23 February 2018.

References

External links
Profile at SC Sagamihara

1987 births
Living people
Ryutsu Keizai University alumni
Association football people from Tokyo
Japanese footballers
J2 League players
J3 League players
Fagiano Okayama players
Oita Trinita players
SC Sagamihara players
Association football midfielders
Universiade bronze medalists for Japan
Universiade medalists in football
People from Ōme, Tokyo
Medalists at the 2009 Summer Universiade
21st-century Japanese people